Hazaribagh jheel is a series of artificial lakes with seven parts all on different levels so that water spills over to the other lake through a spill channel. It is an engineering marvel which conserves water and supplies to people living in Hazaribagh. It was constructed by Britishers in 1831 when they were building the central jail in Hazaribagh. They required huge amounts of clay, leaving four big craters which became lakes.

Source 
Official Website of Jharkhand government
Artificial lakes of India
Hazaribagh district
Lakes of Jharkhand